Geographia Polonica is a peer-reviewed scientific journal published by the Institute of Geography and Spatial Organisation of the Polish Academy of Sciences.  The journal is subsidized by the Ministry of Science and Higher Education of Poland.

See also 
Fennia
Geografiska Annaler
Danish Journal of Geography
Norwegian Journal of Geography

References

External links 
 

Geography journals
Multilingual journals
Polish-language journals
English-language journals
1964 establishments in Poland
Publications established in 1964
Polish Academy of Sciences academic journals
Quarterly journals